Jayanth Manda (born 1939, Hyderabad, Andhra Pradesh) is a contemporary Indian artist.

Biography 
After preliminary practice in the art of drawing and painting at local schools, he joined Sir J. J. School of Art, Mumbai and obtained Diploma in Painting in 1964. 
Studied Mural techniques at faculty of Fine Arts, M. S. University, Baroda, in 1967 under the guidance of Professor K.G. Subrahmanyam.

He has held many solo exhibitions and participated in group exhibitions at all the major cities of India.
He was an active member of DISHA - a creative artists group which projected the contemporary social situation in India.
He joined Doordarshan Kendra, Hyderabad in 1972.
He was trained at Film and  Institute of India FTII, Pune in 1976 and 1982 in the field of "Film and Television Programme Production Techniques", became trained Television Producer and continued working for Doordarshan Kendra and retired as Assistant Station Director, Doordarshan Kendra in 1996.

He was conferred Doctorate in "Television Communication and role of Indian Culture" in 2003, Osmania University Hyderabad.

At present he is practicing as a professional painter.

Exhibitions 
 First One Man Show at USIS, Hyderabad. 1964
 Second One Man who at Ajanta Pavilion, Hyderabad, 1965
 Group Show FRIENDS at New Delhi 1966
 Group Show held at Kalabhavan, Hyderabad in 1969
 Group Show held at Film & Television Institute, Pune
 Third One Man show at Kalabhavan, Hyderabad in 1981
 Hyderabad Art Society - Members Painting Workshop 2008
 Department of Culture - A.P. Senior Artists Painting Workshop 2008
 Senior Artists of India - Painting Workshop 2008

Awards 
 First Prize Annual Art Exhibition, Hyderabad Art Society
 First Prize from AP Lalit Kala Akademi
 First Prize from Bharat Kala Parishath
 Outstanding Award from Bharat Kala Parishath
 Award from All India fine Arts & Crafts society, New Delhi, 2003
 University, Annual State Level Art Exhibition, 2002.
 "Prathiba Puraskar" from Potti Sriramulu Telugu University, A.P - 2005
 "Bharath Excellence Award & Gold medal" - Friendship Forum of India - 2008
 "Rashtriya Jewel Award & Gold medal" - Friendship Forum of India - 2008

References 

Sadrishyam

External links 
 Jayanth manda's Official Website
 

20th-century Indian painters
Painters from Andhra Pradesh
1939 births
Living people
Indian contemporary painters
Indian male painters
20th-century Indian male artists
21st-century Indian male artists